Kyauksein Pagoda, formally known as the Varocana Kyauksein Zedi (ဝေရောစန ကျောက်စိမ်းစေတီတော်), is a Buddhist pagoda located in the outskirts of Amarapura, Mandalay Region, Myanmar (Burma).

The pagoda was erected by the jade mining family of Soe Naing and Aye Aye Khaing, who donated both the pagoda and pagoda grounds. Construction on the pagoda began in November 2012, and the umbrella-hoisting ceremony to inaugurate the pagoda was held on 5 June 2015.

See also
Buddhism in Myanmar

References

Pagodas in Myanmar
Buildings and structures in Mandalay Region
Religious buildings and structures completed in 2015